Agatho may refer to:

Pope Agatho (577–681), a pope of the Catholic Church
Pope Agatho of Alexandria (died 680), Pope of Alexandria and Patriarch of the See of St. Mark
Agatho, the martyred son of Hor and Susia

See also
Agathon (name)
Agathos, Greek language for "good"

Masculine given names